Coedffranc is a village in the county borough of Neath Port Talbot, Wales.

Today it has merged into an enlarged Skewen, occupying the central regions of the village of Skewen.  Coedffranc is also a local government community.
The community includes the villages of Jersey Marine, Llandarcy and Coed Darcy. and had a population of 9,053 in 2011.

Governance
Coedffranc encompasses the electoral wards of Coedffranc Central, Coedffranc North and Coedffranc West for elections to Neath Port Talbot County Borough Council.

Coedffranc was also the name of an electoral ward of West Glamorgan from 4 May 1989, formed from Coedffranc Central and Coedffranc East by The County of West Glamorgan (Electoral Arrangements) Order 1989. Coedffranc Central and Coedffranc East were recreated for the Neath Port Talbot local elections of 1995.

Prior to 1974 Coedffranc was a ward to Glamorgan County Council, electing one councillor.

References

External links
Coedffranc Community Council

Villages in Neath Port Talbot
Communities in Neath Port Talbot
Electoral wards of West Glamorgan
Former wards of Wales
Glamorgan electoral wards